Ramatu High School is a public school located in a small village called Dinokana (Ngaka Modiri Molema District Municipality), near Zeerust in the North West, South Africa. It was founded in 1982 by H.L Setlalentwa and was named after the then chief of Dinokana village. Ramatu High School is well known for its highest learners performance and their excellence with the teachers hardwork and parents' efforts.

Schools in North West (South African province)
Ngaka Modiri Molema District Municipality